Vishwasghaat is a 1996 Bollywood action film directed by Himanshu Brahmbhatt. The film stars Sunil Shetty, Anjali Jathar and Anupam Kher.

Plot
Rammohan lives a poor lifestyle in India along with his grandson, Avinash, the only child of his late son, Indermohan. Rammohan is disappointed with Avinash as he always seems to be getting into trouble and fisticuffs. Quite unknown to him, Avinash makes a living by wrestling. Then one day Rammohan finds out that Avinash has got into a fight with a gangster named Yeda Topi, who had complained to the police, and as a result Avinash had been arrested, held in a cell, and beaten up Police Inspector Inamdar. Rammohan arranges for Avinash's bail, but warns him not to get into trouble again. Instead of coming home, Avinash disappears for several days, compelling Rammohan to file a missing persons' report. Rammohan does get re-united with his grandson - only to find out that Avinash is not wanted by the police for the murder of Yeda Topi, but he has also been masquerading as Dr. Sunil Verma, and romancing Sunil's mentally unstable girlfriend, Neha Khurana. Watch what impact these revelations have on their relationship.

Cast
 Sunil Shetty as Avinash Saxena / Dr. Sunil Verma
 Anjali Jathar as Neha Khurana 
 Anupam Kher as Indramohan Saxena / Professor Khurana
 Kiran Kumar as Advocate Chadha
 Mushtaq Khan as Gullu 
 Mahesh Anand as Babu Seth 
 Rakesh Bedi as Havaldar Lepatakde 
 Deep Dhillon as Inspector Inamdar 
 Avtar Gill as DCP Gill 
 Chandrakant Gokhale as Rammohan Saxena 
 Gavin Packard as Foreign Tiger
 Mac Mohan as Raja
 Ishrat Ali as Yeda Topi 
 Amrit Patel as Rammohan's Neighbour

Songs

References

External links
 

1996 films
Films scored by Shyam-Surendar
1990s Hindi-language films
Indian action drama films